Simon Robinson (born 16 February 1981) is an English professional golfer.

Robinson was born in Hartlepool. He was successful as a junior, winning both the world and European boys championships. He played college golf at the University of Houston.

Robinson turned professional in 2004 and has played predominantly on the lower level tours. In 2005 he won three times on the PGA EuroPro Tour to finish in third place on the Order of Merit and earn his place on the second tier Challenge Tour for 2006.

Robinson played on the Challenge Tour for four seasons. His best year was 2008 when he claimed his first title on the tour, the SK Golf Challenge held in Finland, and finished 46th on the end of season rankings.

Amateur wins
1999 World Boys Championship, European Boys Championship

Professional wins (4)

Challenge Tour wins (1)

PGA EuroPro Tour wins (3)
2005 Swallow Suffolk Open, Oakley International Open, Golf Pages Classic

Team appearances
Amateur
Palmer Cup (representing Great Britain & Ireland): 2000 (winners)

References

External links

English male golfers
Houston Cougars men's golfers
European Tour golfers
Sportspeople from Hartlepool
People from Seaton Carew
1981 births
Living people